Omoglymmius philippinensis is a species of beetle in the subfamily Rhysodidae. It was described by Louis Alexandre Auguste Chevrolat in 1875.

References

philippinensis
Beetles described in 1875